Amelanchier humilis, commonly known as the low shadbush, is a North American species of serviceberry.  It is native to central Canada (from Saskatchewan to Québec) and the northeastern and north-central United States (from Nebraska and the Dakotas east as far as Vermont and New Jersey).

Amelanchier humilis is a shrub up to 120 cm (4 feet) tall. The fruit, which is a pome, is very dark, almost black. It is edible and can be eaten raw or cooked. The fruit has a sweet taste, with slight apple flavor. The leaves are egg-shaped, up to 5 cm (2 inches) long.

References

External links
 Boreal Forest, Amelanchier humilis Shadbush
 

humilis
Flora of Western Canada
Plants described in 1912
Plants used in Native American cuisine
Flora of Eastern Canada
Flora of the Northeastern United States
Flora of the North-Central United States
Flora without expected TNC conservation status